The following is a list of rivers in the Manawatū-Whanganui Region. The list is arranged in arranged North to South by the location of the river mouth. Tributaries are indented under their downstream parent's name and arranged by nearest to the source.

Tasman Sea
Whanganui River
Whakapapa River
Pungapunga River
Ongarue River
Maramataha River
Taringamotu River
Ohura River
Taumona River
Retaruke River
Tāngarākau River
Whangamōmona River
Manganui o te Ao River
Makatote River
Mangaturuturu River
Whangaehu River
Wahianoa River
Mangawhero River
Makotuku River
Turakina River
Mangapapa River
Rangitīkei River
Mangamaire River
Whakaurekou River
Mangatera River
Maropea River
Waikamaka River
Moawhango River
Moawhango West River
Hautapu River
Kawhatau River
Pourangaki River
Mangawharariki River
Manawatū River
Mangatewainui River
Mangatoro River
Tamaki River
Tiraumea River
Ihuraua River
Makuri River
Mangaone River
Mangatainoka River
Mākākahi River
Mangahao River
Pohangina River
Oroua River
Tokomaru River
Ohau River

Pacific Ocean
Wainui River
Ākitio River
Red River
Owahanga River
Pongaroa River

Manawatū-Whanganui